A boule is a single-crystal ingot produced by synthetic means.

A boule of silicon is the starting material for most of the integrated circuits used today. In the semiconductor industry synthetic boules can be made by a number of methods, such as the Bridgman technique and the Czochralski process, which result in a cylindrical rod of material.

In the Czochralski process a seed crystal is required to create a larger crystal, or ingot. This seed crystal is dipped into the pure molten silicon and slowly extracted. The molten silicon grows on the seed crystal in a crystalline fashion. As the seed is extracted the silicon solidifies and eventually a large, cylindrical boule is produced.

A semiconductor crystal boule is normally cut into circular wafers using an inside hole diamond saw or diamond wire saw, and each wafer is lapped and polished to provide substrates suitable for the fabrication of semiconductor devices on its surface.

The process is also used to create sapphires, which are used for substrates in the production of blue and white LEDs, optical windows in special applications and as the protective covers for watches.

References

Crystals
Semiconductor growth